The Lighthouse Boys are an American Southern Gospel band from Bakersfield, California, and progenitors of "The Bakersfield Sound".  The group began in 1974 by brothers Mark and Bill Underwood and Bill's brother in-law Steve Johnson.  In 1976, the trio expanded from a vocal ensemble to a full band with the addition of Frank McNinch, Garry Miller, and Kenny Knight.  The band recorded their self-titled debut album in the late 1970s and released it in 1980.  The band has undergone many line-up changes throughout their recording and touring careers, but the core trio has remained at the helm during their history.

Career / Ministry

Founding and early years

Founded in 1974 in Bakersfield, California by Mark Underwood and Steve Johnson, who had been writing songs together since in 1973.  By 1974 Mark's older brother Bill Underwood joined and they began performing all around California.

In 1975 Mark attended a concert that was put on by the Jesus music band Amplified Version, Mark began to talk with them, and they convinced Mark that for The Lighthouse Boys to continue successfully they needed to get a sound system to take with them on the road. That same year a sound system was purchased.  In 1976 The Lighthouse Boys became a full quartet when Frank McNinch joined on bass vocals to fill out the sound.  They also added Garry Miller on bass guitar and Kenny Knight on drums to fill out the rest of the band.

In 1977 The Lighthouse Boys performed at The Blackwood Brothers and Gospelares Talent Show in Fresno, California at the Selland Arena.  They also made an appearance on The Bakersfield, CA local broadcast of The Jerry Lewis MDA Telethon.

In 1978, the group began recording their first album.  They entered Buck Owens' Recording Studio to record five of the songs that would go on that record.  Jim Shaw who produced the album was later quoted as saying "They were fun sessions.  I just remember they had a nice, gospel-flavored country sound and that we enjoyed working with The Lighthouse Boys"

The 80's

By 1980 The Lighthouse Boys finished and released their first album and went through a major member change.  Steve took some time away after the departures of Frank, Garry and Kenny in 1979.  With new members Tim Cantu, Dathan Fernandez, Ken Edwards, and Jon Edwards along with Mark and Bill the group had won their first award, recorded a live album at the "Western Desert Gospel Sing" on Memorial Day at The San Bernardino Fair Grounds in Victorville, CA.  The Lighthouse Boys had become one of the top artists in the west.

In 1983 Mark, Steve and Bill joined up with a few other musicians to form "New Covenant" to perform and record while The Lighthouse Boys took on a very limited schedule.  "New Covenant" recorded three songs, two of which were released on a Sampler LP for what was known as The WGA, on that LP was a re-recording of The Lighthouse Boys song "When The Saints of God are Called T'ward Heaven."   In 1984 The Lighthouse Boys made another appearance in Bakersfield on the local broadcast of The Jerry Lewis MDA Telethon.  Mark and Steve continued to write songs.  The group continued to make appearances on local TV programs and various annual events, Mark spent some time with a group out of Taft, CA called "Sonrise."  On Memorial Day 1987 The Lighthouse Boys made an appearance performing three sets over two stages at The Western Desert Gospel Reunion at the San Bernardino Fair Grounds in Victorville, CA.  In July they entered the studio again to cut a new single that was originally planned to be given to Jimmy Swaggart, instead it sparked a desire to re-emerge on the road, this time joined on drums by Bill's son Stephen Underwood.

The 90's 

In 1989, Mark Underwood, Steve Johnson & Ken Edwards signed a one-year contract as writers with a publishing company.  The Lighthouse Boys went into the studio to record 6 songs, but soon after the recording Ken Edwards took time away to help his father's radio station in Dry Prong, Louisiana.  A young man by the name of Terry Mullin joined as lead singer.  The Lighthouse Boys recorded backup vocals for soloist Debra Hoopiiaina on her album "Bought With A Price."  In 1993 after Ken Edwards' return and a move down to bass vocals for Terry, The Lighthouse Boys released the previous six songs recorded from 1989 as a compilation album with five songs from their first album.  In 1994, The Lighthouse Boys went back into the studio where they felt at home: Fat Tracks - formerly The Buck Owens Recording Studio.  They joined the Western States Gospel Music Association and hit a North West US tour in the summer and released their third studio album, Golden Classics.  On December 31, 1994 while The Lighthouse Boys celebrated their 20th anniversary, the original quartet Mark Underwood, Steve Johnson, Bill Underwood and Frank McNinch reunited for one concert in which they performed five songs from their first album.

In 1995 The Lighthouse Boys released the radio single "Midnight Cry" through the Rick Hendrix Company. Between 1995 and 1997 they toured the North West and Southern parts of the United States.  In October 1997 they made an afternoon showcase appearance at Suwannee River Jubilee held in Live Oak, Florida.  The fans were so enthused by the performance The Lighthouse Boys were asked to perform on the evening show.  The quartet also began performing annually at The Great Western Quartet Convention (a "spin-off" event from the National Quartet Convention).

In 1998 Mark temporarily lost his voice, a young man by the name of Tim Williams had just stepped down as music minister at his home Church at Northland Assembly of God in Bakersfield, CA.  Tim was originally joining to play keyboards, but because of Mark's vocal health, Mark continued playing keyboards and Tim took over singing Tenor.

2000’s 

In March 2000, The Lighthouse Boys released Golden Classics 2.  In October after 20 years with The Lighthouse Boys, Ken Edwards left the group.  Terry Mullin and Tim Williams left as well to reform Golden State Quartet.  In 2001, original member Steve Johnson stepped back in, Stephen Underwood moved from the Drums to Lead Vocalist and The Lighthouse Boys set back out on the road.  In 2002,  they met up with producer Mark Yeary and recorded the single "The Blood Will Never Lose Its Power."  The song was recorded for a special compilation project called IAMM Volume 1.  They also guest appeared on the album I'll Be There by Mark Yeary's sister, Cathy Hollowell.

In February 2004, the group celebrated their 30th anniversary.  In the summer of that year, their keyboardist Mike Smith was found by his bike after falling asleep while driving home from work.  He had run off the road in the hills outside of Santa Maria.

In October, Bill Underwood left the road to pastor a church.  Mark brought up his son Joe Underwood to sing baritone, they continued with Stephen Underwood as a trio until they briefly shut down in December 2005.

In 2006 Mark, Steve, Bill & Stephen came back together to perform limited concert dates, their first concert back was the 2006 Great Western Southern Gospel Fan Festival at The Save Mart Center in Fresno, California.  They again performed there in 2007.  In 2008, The Lighthouse Boys went live again for the first time in four years with the addition of Tommy Smith; a veteran Bass Guitarist who had played with the likes of Bobby Durham, Brian Lonbeck, Mark Yeary and The Buckaroos.

2010's 

In December 2009 Stephen Underwood returned to the Drums, and Ken Edwards stepped back in to sing lead.  April 29, 2010, The Lighthouse Boys returned to the Great Western Fan Fest and released Midnight Cry: The Lighthouse Boys Essential Collection, a 20-song compilation celebrating the years from 1994 to 2000.  On October 30, 2010 for the first time in 10 years, The Lighthouse Boys reunited the most popular version of the group with members Mark Underwood, Bill Underwood, Ken Edwards, Terry Mullin and Stephen Underwood for their entire set during the final 5th Saturday Sing of the year.  Tim Williams also joined them on 2 songs.

In December 2012, Jimmy Woods (son of Bakersfield Country Music Legend, Bill Woods) joined The Lighthouse Boys on keyboards.  The Lighthouse Boys returned to The Great Western Fan Fest in Visalia, CA with Tommy Smith singing Lead vocals.

40 

In 2014, The Lighthouse Boys announced their 40th Anniversary.  In May The Lighthouse Boys rejoined The Western States Gospel Music Association (WSGMA).  In February 2015, The Lighthouse Boys released their single "From Heaven's Point of View" to digital music stores  and to Radio through Patterson Music Promotions.

January 25, 2016, The Lighthouse Boys original drummer Kenny Knight passed away suddenly at age 52

In April 2016, "The Lighthouse Boys Ultimate Collection" featuring songs from every studio recording including 2 new songs.

In May 2016, Stephen Underwood officially stepped down from live performance, Randy Ivie (formerly of Golden State Quartet) filled in in June and joined officially as new Lead Singer in September.

Personnel (past and present) 
{| class="toccolours"  border=1 cellpadding=2 cellspacing=0 style="width: 700px; margin: 0 0 1em 1em; border-collapse: collapse; border: 1px solid #E2E2E2;"
|+ <big>The Lighthouse Boys lineups</big>
|-
! style="background:#e7ebee;"| 1974
|
 Mark Underwood – tenor vocals, bass guitar
 Steve Johnson – lead vocals
 Bill Underwood – baritone vocals, rhythm guitar
|-
! style="background:#e7ebee;"| 1974-1975
|
 Mark Underwood – tenor vocals, bass guitar
 Steve Johnson – lead vocals
 Bill Underwood – baritone vocals, rhythm guitar
(with supporting members)
 Helen Underwood Embry - Piano
 Sharon Underwood – backup singer
 Donna Johnson – backup singer
|-
! style="background:#e7ebee;"| 1976-1978
|
 Mark Underwood – tenor vocals, piano
 Steve Johnson – lead vocals
 Bill Underwood – baritone vocals, rhythm guitar
 Frank McNinch – bass vocals
 Gary Miller – Bass Guitar
 Kenny Knight – Drums
|
The Lighthouse Boys (1980)
|-
! style="background:#e7ebee;"| 1979
|
 Mark Underwood – tenor vocals, piano, keyboards
 Steve Johnson – lead vocals
 Bill Underwood – baritone vocals, rhythm guitar
 Tim Cantu – drums, backup vocals
 Dathan Fernandez – lead guitar, guitar effects
|-
! style="background:#e7ebee;"| 1979–1980
|
 Mark Underwood – tenor vocals, piano, keyboards
 Bill Underwood – baritone vocals, rhythm guitar, bass guitar
 Tim Cantu – drums, background vocals
 Dathan Fernandez – lead guitar, guitar effects
 Ken Edwards – lead vocals, bass guitar, rhythm guitar
 Jon Edwards – bass vocals, rhythm guitar
|
'The Lighthouse Boys - Live (2003) recorded May 26, 1980
|-
! style="background:#e7ebee;"| 1981–1983 
(limited appearances)
|
 Mark Underwood – tenor vocals, piano, keyboards
 Steve Johnson – lead vocals
 Bill Underwood – baritone vocals, rhythm guitar
|-
! style="background:#e7ebee;"| 1983
(limited appearances)
|
 Mark Underwood – tenor vocals, piano, keyboards
 Bill Underwood – baritone vocals, rhythm guitar, bass guitar
 Tim Cantu – drums, background vocals
 Ken Edwards – lead vocals, bass guitar, rhythm guitar
 Jon Edwards – bass vocals, rhythm guitar
|-
! style="background:#e7ebee;"| 1984–1985
(limited appearances)
|
 Mark Underwood – tenor vocals, piano, keyboards
 Steve Johnson – lead vocals
 Bill Underwood – baritone vocals, rhythm guitar
|-
! style="background:#e7ebee;"| 1985–1986
(limited appearances)
|
 Mark Underwood – tenor vocals, piano, keyboards
 Steve Johnson – lead vocals
 Bill Underwood – baritone vocals, rhythm guitar
 Tim Cantu - drums, background vocals
 Ken Edwards – lead vocals, bass guitar, rhythm guitar
|-
! style="background:#e7ebee;"| 1986–1987
|
 Mark Underwood – tenor vocals, piano
 Steve Johnson – bass vocals, lead vocals
 Bill Underwood – baritone vocals, rhythm guitar, bass guitar
 Tim Cantu – drums, background vocals
 Ken Edwards – lead vocals, bass guitar, rhythm guitar
 Stephen Underwood - Tambourine, drums
|-
! style="background:#e7ebee;"| 1987–1991
|
 Mark Underwood – tenor vocals, piano, Fender Rhodes
 Bill Underwood – baritone vocals, rhythm guitar, bass guitar
 Ken Edwards – lead vocals, bass guitar, rhythm guitar
 Stephen Underwood – drums
|-
! style="background:#e7ebee;"| 1991–1992
|
 Mark Underwood – tenor vocals, piano, Fender Rhodes
 Steve Johnson – bass vocals
 Bill Underwood – baritone vocals, rhythm guitar
 Stephen Underwood – drums
 Terry Mullin – lead vocals, bass guitar
|-
! style="background:#e7ebee;"| 1992-1993
|
 Mark Underwood – tenor vocals, piano
 Steve Johnson – bass vocals
 Bill Underwood – baritone vocals, rhythm guitar
 Ken Edwards – lead vocals, bass guitar
 Stephen Underwood – drums
|
 The Lighthouse Boys (1993)
|-
! style="background:#e7ebee;"| 1993–1997
|
 Mark Underwood – tenor vocals, piano, keyboards
 Bill Underwood – baritone vocals, rhythm guitar
 Ken Edwards – lead vocals, bass guitar
 Stephen Underwood – drums
 Terry Mullin – bass vocals
|Golden Classics (1994)
|-
! style="background:#e7ebee;"| 1997
|
 Mark Underwood – tenor vocals, piano, keyboards
 Bill Underwood – baritone vocals, rhythm guitar
 Ken Edwards – lead vocals, bass guitar
 Stephen Underwood – drums
 Terry Mullin – bass vocals
 Jeff Johnson - drums, bass guitar, vocals
|After I Get to Heaven (2003)
|-
! style="background:#e7ebee;"| 1997
|
 Mark Underwood – tenor vocals
 Bill Underwood – baritone vocals, rhythm guitar
 Ken Edwards – lead vocals, bass guitar
 Stephen Underwood – drums
 Terry Mullin – bass vocals
 Ted McClaren - piano, keyboards
|-
! style="background:#e7ebee;"| 1998
|
 Mark Underwood – keyboards, vocals
 Bill Underwood – baritone vocals, rhythm guitar
 Ken Edwards – lead vocals, bass guitar
 Stephen Underwood – drums
 Terry Mullin – bass vocals
 Tim Williams – tenor vocals
|-
! style="background:#e7ebee;"| 1998-1999
|
 Mark Underwood – tenor vocals, piano, keyboards
 Steve Johnson – bass vocals
 Bill Underwood – baritone vocals, rhythm guitar
 Tim Cantu – sound engineer, drums
 Stephen Underwood – lead vocals
|-
! style="background:#e7ebee;"| 1999-2000
|
 Mark Underwood – piano, vocals
 Bill Underwood – baritone vocals, rhythm guitar
 Ken Edwards – lead vocals, bass guitar
 Stephen Underwood – drums
 Terry Mullin – bass vocals
 Tim Williams – tenor vocals
|Golden Classics 2 (2000)
|-
! style="background:#e7ebee;"| 2001-2002
|
 Mark Underwood – tenor vocals
 Steve Johnson – bass vocals
 Bill Underwood – baritone vocals
 Stephen Underwood – lead vocals
|The Blood Will Never Lose Its Power-The Single (2002)
|-
! style="background:#e7ebee;"| 2002-2003
|
 Mark Underwood – tenor vocals, piano, keyboards
 Steve Johnson – bass vocals
 Bill Underwood – baritone vocals, rhythm guitar
 Stephen Underwood – lead vocals
 Joe Underwood – bass guitar
 Russ Higgens – drums
|-
! style="background:#e7ebee;"| 2003-2004
|
 Mark Underwood – tenor vocals
 Bill Underwood – baritone vocals, rhythm guitar
 Stephen Underwood – lead vocals
 Joe Underwood – bass guitar
 Jeff Edwards – drums
 Roger Peirce – bass vocals
 Mike Smith – keyboards, vocals
|-
! style="background:#e7ebee;"| 2004
|
 Mark Underwood – tenor vocals, keyboards
 Bill Underwood – baritone vocals, rhythm guitar
 Stephen Underwood – lead vocals, drums
 Joe Underwood – bass guitar
 Roger Peirce – bass vocals
|-
! style="background:#e7ebee;"| 2004-2005
|
 Mark Underwood – tenor vocals
 Stephen Underwood – lead vocals
 Joe Underwood – baritone vocals
|
 The Best of The Lighthouse Boys 1974-2004 (2005)
|-
! style="background:#e7ebee;"| 2006-2007
(limited appearances)
|
 Mark Underwood – tenor vocals
 Steve Johnson – bass vocals
 Bill Underwood – baritone vocals
 Stephen Underwood – lead vocals
|-
! style="background:#e7ebee;"| 2008
|
 Mark Underwood – tenor vocals, keyboards
 Steve Johnson – bass vocals
 Bill Underwood – baritone vocals, rhythm guitar
 Stephen Underwood – lead vocals
 Tommy Smith - bass guitar
 Chuck Crocker - drums
|-
! style="background:#e7ebee;"| 2009
|
 Mark Underwood – tenor vocals, keyboards
 Steve Johnson – bass vocals
 Bill Underwood – baritone vocals, rhythm guitar
 Stephen Underwood – lead vocals
 Tommy Smith - bass guitar
 Franky Olds - drums
|-
! style="background:#e7ebee;"| 2009
|
 Mark Underwood – tenor vocals, keyboards
 Steve Johnson – bass vocals
 Bill Underwood – baritone vocals, rhythm guitar
 Tim Cantu - drums
 Stephen Underwood – lead vocals
 Tommy Smith - bass guitar
|-
! style="background:#e7ebee;"| 2009–2010
|
 Mark Underwood – tenor vocals, keyboards
 Steve Johnson - bass vocals
 Bill Underwood – baritone vocals, rhythm guitar
 Ken Edwards - lead vocals
 Stephen Underwood – drums
 Tommy Smith - bass guitar
|
 Midnight Cry: The Lighthouse Boys Essential Collection (2010)
|-
! style="background:#e7ebee;"| 2011-2012
|
 Mark Underwood – tenor vocals, keyboards
 Steve Johnson – bass vocals
 Bill Underwood – baritone vocals, rhythm guitar
 Tim Cantu - drums
 Stephen Underwood – lead vocals
 Tommy Smith - bass guitar
|-
! style="background:#e7ebee;"| 2012
|
 Mark Underwood – tenor vocals, keyboards
 Steve Johnson - bass vocals
 Bill Underwood – baritone vocals, rhythm guitar
 Stephen Underwood – drums
 Tommy Smith - lead vocals, bass guitar
|-
! style="background:#e7ebee;"| 2012–2014
|
 Mark Underwood – tenor vocals
 Steve Johnson – bass vocals
 Bill Underwood – baritone vocals, rhythm guitar
 Stephen Underwood – drums, Vocals
 Tommy Smith - lead vocals, bass guitar
 Jimmy Woods - keyboards
|-
! style="background:#e7ebee;"| 2014
|
 Mark Underwood – tenor vocals
 Steve Johnson – bass vocals
 Bill Underwood – baritone vocals, rhythm guitar
 Stephen Underwood – drums, Vocals
 Tommy Smith - bass guitar
 Jimmy Woods - keyboards
 Duane Meadows - lead vocals
|Songs For Easter (Limited Edition digital compilation EP) (2014)
|-
! style="background:#e7ebee;"| 2014–2015
|
 Mark Underwood – tenor vocals
 Steve Johnson – bass vocals
 Bill Underwood – baritone vocals, rhythm guitar
 Stephen Underwood – drums, Vocals
 Tommy Smith - bass guitar
 Jimmy Woods - keyboards
 Carl Barber - lead vocals
|From Heaven's Point of View - The Single (2015)
|-
! style="background:#e7ebee;"| 2015
|
 Mark Underwood – tenor vocals
 Steve Johnson – bass vocals
 Bill Underwood – baritone vocals
 Stephen Underwood – lead vocals
 Jimmy Woods - keyboards
|The Lighthouse Boys Ultimate Collection'' (2016)
|-
! style="background:#e7ebee;"| 2015-2016
|
 Mark Underwood – tenor vocals
 Steve Johnson – bass vocals
 Bill Underwood – baritone vocals
 Stephen Underwood – lead vocals
|-
! style="background:#e7ebee;"| 2016–Present
|
 Mark Underwood – tenor vocals
 Steve Johnson – bass vocals
 Bill Underwood – baritone vocals
 Randy Ivie – lead vocals
|}

 Studio musicians 

A list of Producers, Engineers and Musicians that The Lighthouse Boys have recorded with over the years.Jim Shaw – Engineer, KeyboardsDoyle Curtsinger – Bass GuitarTerry Christoffersen – Guitar, Steel GuitarBrian Lonbeck – GuitarMark Yeary – Producer, KeyboardsMax Reese – EngineerTracy Heaston – Producer, KeyboardsMike Pillow – ProducerJerry Mulkins – GuitarJimmy Woods – KeyboardsNick Forcillo – Engineer

Discography

Albums
Source:

*originally recorded May 26, 1980
**originally recorded from 1995 to 1997

Singles

Other Appearances1991 Debra Hoopiiaina - Bought With A Price (Indie)1995 Rick Hendrix Radio Source 1995 Volume 1 (Rick Hendrix Company)1995 WSGMA 20 Great Songs (WSGMA)2002 I.A.M.M Volume 1 (International Association of Music Ministries)2002 Cathy Hollowell - I'll Be There (Oreely Multi-Media)2003 Don Hodge - Song Promo''' (Indie)

References

 Gospel Voice Magazine June 1994 "Just West of Here"
 Resource Publications, "The Christian Music Directories" formerly "The Recording Locator" - https://web.archive.org/web/20101006063310/http://www.rpinet.com/cmd.html
 http://www.thelighthouseboys.com The Lighthouse Boys Official Website
 https://web.archive.org/web/20110708124901/http://www.ccauthority.com/interviews/lighthouseboys.htm Interview with The Lighthouse Boys on CCAuthority.com
 http://nl.newsbank.com/cgi-bin/ngate/BCAB?ext_docid=1006D5E2B46C4AB9&ext_hed=A+30-year+musical+journey&ext_theme=bcab&pubcode=BCAB "A 30-Year Musical Journey" Bakersfield Californian Newspaper (must have a user name and password)

External links
 The Lighthouse Boys Official Website
 Stephen Underwood Official Website
 The Lighthouse Boys Official YouTube Channel
 The Lighthouse Boys Official MySpace Page
 The Lighthouse Boys Official FaceBook Page
 Bakersfield Californian Official Website

American gospel musical groups
Gospel quartets
Musical groups established in 1974
Southern gospel performers